The Eshaqabad District of Zeberkhan County ( is a district in Zeberkhan County, Razavi Khorasan province, Iran. At the 2006 census, its population was 10,110, in 2,618 families. The district has no cities. The district has two rural districts (dehestan): Eshaqabad Rural District and Heshmatieh Rural District.

References 

Districts of Razavi Khorasan Province
Nishapur County